Sheikh Ali Ramitani (Urdu عزیزان شیخ علی الرامتانی ) was born in the Ramitan area around Bukhara Uzbekistan.  Due to his specialty in weaving cloth, Sheikh Ali Ramitani is often called Sheikh Nessac (weaver). After studying religious science, Sheikh Ali Ramitani conferred on Mahmood Anjir-Faghnawi When Sheikh Mahmud Injir Faghnawi was about to die, he handed over his ordination (tabligh) to Sheikh Ali Ramatini q.s followed by the observance of the other disciples.

References

Naqshbandi order
Sufi religious leaders
Sufis
Founders of Sufi orders
Sufi saints
1194 births
1315 deaths